Rabbit Lake is a small lake in the municipality of Georgian Bay, District Municipality of Muskoka in Central Ontario, Canada. It is part of the Great Lakes Basin and lies in geographic Gibson Township. The lake flows at the north via an unnamed creek to Bushby Inlet on Georgian Bay, Lake Huron.

See also
List of lakes in Ontario

References

Other map sources:

Lakes of the District Municipality of Muskoka